The 1983 All-Big Eight Conference football team consists of American football players chosen by various organizations for All-Big Eight Conference teams for the 1983 NCAA Division I-A football season.  The selectors for the 1983 season included the Associated Press (AP).

Offensive selections

Quarterbacks
 Turner Gill, Nebraska (AP)

Running backs
 Mike Rozier, Nebraska (AP)
 Shawn Jones, Oklahoma State (AP)

Tight ends
 Dave Hestera, Colorado (AP)

Wide receivers
 Irving Fryar, Nebraska (AP)
 Tracy Henderson, Iowa State

Centers
 Chuck Thomas, Oklahoma (AP)

Down linemen
 Dean Steinkuhler, Nebraska (AP)
 Scott Raridon, Nebraska (AP)
 Kevin Igo, Oklahoma State (AP)
 Conrad Goode, Missouri (AP)

Defensive selections

Defensive ends
 Kevin Murphy, Oklahoma (AP)
 Bobby Bell, Missouri (AP)

Down linemen
 Rick Bryan, Oklahoma (AP)
 Leslie O'Neal, Oklahoma State (AP)
 Reggie Singletary, Kansas State (AP)

Linebackers
 Jay Wilson, Missouri (AP)
 Mike Knox, Nebraska (AP)
 Jackie Shipp, Oklahoma (AP)

Defensive backs
 Scott Case, Oklahoma (AP)
 Victor Scott, Colorado (AP)
 Bret Clark, Nebraska (AP)

Special teams

Place-kicker
 Bruce Kallmeyer, Kansas (AP)

Punter
 John Conway, Oklahoma State (AP)

Key

AP = Associated Press

See also
 1983 College Football All-America Team

References

All-Big Seven Conference football team
All-Big Eight Conference football teams